Arthur John Randle (3 December 1880 – 1913) was an English footballer who played in the Football League for Leicester Fosse and West Bromwich Albion.

References

1880 births
1913 deaths
English footballers
Association football goalkeepers
English Football League players
Darlaston Town F.C. players
West Bromwich Albion F.C. players
Leicester City F.C. players